Mary Petrie (born September 23, 1951) is a Canadian former pair skater.  With  Robert McAvoy, she twice won the silver medal at the Canadian Figure Skating Championships.  She later became partners with John Hubbell, and with him, she added another pair of silver medals at nationals and competed at the 1972 Winter Olympics.

Results
pairs with John Hubbell

pairs with Robert McAvoy

References

1951 births
Canadian female pair skaters
Figure skaters at the 1972 Winter Olympics
Olympic figure skaters of Canada
Living people